The Wrestling events for the 2010 Commonwealth Games were held on Indira Gandhi Arena from 5 to 10 October 2010. Unlike other major wrestling events only one bronze medal was awarded per event.

Medal table

Events

Men's events

Freestyle

Greco-Roman

Women's events

Freestyle

Participating nations

Popular Culture 
Geeta Phogat was India's first female wrestler to win at the 2010 Commonwealth Games, where she won the gold medal (55 kg) while her sister Babita Kumari won the silver (51 kg). This came back in the 2016 Indian movie Dangal.

See also

References

External links 
 Schedule

 
2010 Commonwealth Games events
Commonwealth Games
2010